Oriel Sea Minerals is a variety of Irish sea minerals.

Oriel Sea Minerals are concentrated sea mineral salts in liquid form and are harvested from the Irish Sea by Oriel Marine Extracts. They are harvested from the bay of Port Oriel near Drogheda.

Oriel Sea Minerals received Protected designation of origin in 2016.

See also
Oriel Sea Salt
 Irish cuisine
 List of Republic of Ireland food and drink products with protected status

References

Irish products with protected designation of origin
Irish cuisine